Sarana Bay is an inlet on the east coast of the island of Attu in the Aleutian Islands in Alaska.  Hodikof Island is a small, 160 m long island in the bay.  The seaward extension of Hodikof Island is known as Hodikof Reef.

Notes

References
Merriam-Webster's Geographical Dictionary, Third Edition. Springfield, Massachusetts: Merriam-Webster, Incorporated, 1997. .
Morison, Samuel Eliot. History of United States Naval Operations in World War II, Volume Seven: Aleutians, Gilberts, and Marshalls, June 1942-April 1944. Boston, Massachusetts: Little, Brown and Company, 1951.

Landforms of the Aleutian Islands
Bodies of water of Aleutians West Census Area, Alaska
Bays of Alaska
Attu Island